Muscidifurax is a genus of parasitoid wasps belonging to the family Pteromalidae.

The genus has almost cosmopolitan distribution.

Species:
 Muscidifurax adanacus Doganlar, 2007 
 Muscidifurax neoraptorellus Xiao & Zhou, 2018
 Muscidifurax raptor Girault & Sanders, 1910 
Muscidifurax raptorellus  Kogan & Legner, 1970 
 Muscidifurax similadanacus Xiao & Zhou, 2018
Muscidifurax uniraptor Kogan & Legner, 1970

References

Pteromalidae
Hymenoptera genera